Izvoru Berheciului is a commune in Bacău County, Western Moldavia, Romania. It is composed of seven villages: Antohești, Băimac, Făghieni, Izvoru Berheciului, Obârșia, Oțelești and Pădureni.

References

Communes in Bacău County
Localities in Western Moldavia